William Robert Moody Jr. (January 12, 1900 - December 21, 1985) was an American prelate who was Bishop of Lexington from 1945 to 1971.

Early life and education
Moody was born in Columbus, Mississippi on January 12, 1900, the son of William Robert Moody and Daisy Butler. He studied at Hampden–Sydney College and earned a Bachelor of Arts in 1921. After graduation, he taught English and Spanish at Greenbrier Military School in Lewisburg, West Virginia, and in 1922 he became head of the English department, a post he kept till 1923. After that, he enrolled at the Virginia Theological Seminary to study for the ordained ministry and graduated with a Bachelor of Divinity in 1926. On July 25, 1928, he married Cordie Lee Winston Moncure, and together had two children. He was awarded a Doctor of Divinity from Hampden–Sydney College in 1944, and another from the Virginia Seminary in 1946.

Ordained Ministry
Moody was ordained deacon on 4, June 1926 by Bishop Beverley D. Tucker of Southern Virginia, and priest April 8, 1927 by Bishop Arthur C. Thomson, Coadjutor of Southern Virginia. Between 1927 and 1928, he served as priest-in-charge of St Andrew's Church in Lawrenceville, Virginia, Emmanuel Church in Callaville, Virginia and St Mark's Church in Cochran, Virginia. He then became rector of Grace Church in Silver Spring, Maryland and remained till 1933. In 1931, he also became Chairman of the department for religious education and a member of the Executive Council and the standing committee. In 1932, he served as instructor of Sacred Duties at St Alban's School for Boys in Washington, D.C. In 1933, he became rector of St Mark's Church in Washington, D.C., while in 1939 became rector of Christ Church in Baltimore.

Bishop
On June 26, 1945, Moody was elected Bishop of Lexington on the third ballot. He was consecrated on October 24, 1945, at Christ Church Cathedral (Lexington, Kentucky), by Presiding Bishop Henry St. George Tucker. He retired in 1971.

Books
Moody was the author of several books including:
The Bishop Speaks His Mind (1959)
The History of the Cathedral Domain in the Diocese of Lexington (1967)

References

1900 births
1985 deaths
20th-century American Episcopalians
Episcopal bishops of Lexington
20th-century American clergy